H'raoua is a municipality in Algiers province, Algeria. It is located in Rouïba district, and is an outer suburb of Algiers. It has a small coastline on the Mediterranean Sea. It was created out of parts of Aïn Taya in 1984. Currently, it is the site of the construction of 1853 homes.

Notable people

Populated places in Algiers Province
Algiers Province